Ben Edward McLemore III (born February 11, 1993) is an American professional basketball player for the Shandong Hi-Speed Kirin of the Chinese Basketball Association (CBA). He played college basketball for the Kansas Jayhawks.

McLemore was selected with the seventh overall pick in the 2013 NBA draft by the Sacramento Kings. He spent four seasons with the team before signing with the Memphis Grizzlies in July 2017. He was traded back to Sacramento in July 2018, but was waived in February 2019. In July of the same year, McLemore signed with the Houston Rockets. He signed with the Los Angeles Lakers in April 2021 and joined the Trail Blazers in August of the same year. McLemore signed with the Shandong Hi-Speed Kirin in January 2023.

High school career
McLemore played high school basketball at Wellston High School in St. Louis, Missouri for three years before his school was shut down in 2010. He then attended both Oak Hill Academy in Mouth of Wilson, Virginia and Christian Life Center in Humble, Texas during his senior year of high school.

Considered a four-star recruit by Rivals.com, McLemore was listed as the No. 9 shooting guard and the No. 34 player in the nation in 2011.

College career
After committing to Kansas, McLemore was deemed ineligible to play by the NCAA because he attended multiple high schools, resulting in his transcripts being "a little fuzzy". He was allowed to practice with the team and take part in team activities starting in the second semester of the school year.

At the beginning of his college career, McLemore was considered to be either a late first-round or early second-round prospect. However, during his first season as a redshirt freshman, McLemore averaged 15.9 points, 5.2 rebounds, and 2.0 assists, with 49.5% shooting from the field and 87% shooting from the foul line, and was named a finalist for the John R. Wooden Award.

After declaring for the 2013 NBA draft, allegations arose that NBA agent Rodney Blackstock had given thousands of dollars in impermissible benefits to McLemore's AAU coach, Darius Cobb, in exchange for Cobb steering McLemore toward certain financial advisers and NBA agents. Lending credence to Cobb's allegations, McLemore had Blackstock on his guest pass list for at least three Kansas home games that season, and subsequently signed Blackstock as his NBA agent. This set of facts caused the launch of an NCAA investigation to determine whether or not Kansas would have to vacate the basketball games in which McLemore played.

Professional career

Sacramento Kings (2013–2017)
McLemore was selected with the seventh overall pick by the Sacramento Kings in the 2013 NBA draft. On July 13, 2013, he signed his rookie scale contract with the Kings and joined them for the 2013 NBA Summer League. He was named the Western Conference Rookie of the Month for November 2013.

In February 2014, McLemore was selected to participate in the 2014 Sprite Slam Dunk contest. In the Kings' final game of the regular season on April 16, McLemore scored a season-high 31 points in a loss to the Phoenix Suns. In his rookie season, he played all 82 games (55 starts), averaging 8.8 points, 2.9 rebounds and 1.0 assists in 26.7 minutes per game.

In July 2014, McLemore re-joined the Kings for the 2014 NBA Summer League where he helped them win the Summer League championship while averaging 12.6 points in seven games. On October 19, 2014, the Kings exercised their third-year team option on McLemore's rookie scale contract, extending the contract through the 2015–16 season. On March 11, 2015, he scored a season-high 27 points in a win over the Charlotte Hornets. He started in all 82 regular season games for the Kings in 2014–15 while averaging 12.1 points, 2.9 rebounds and 1.7 assists in 32.6 minutes per game.

On October 3, 2015, the Kings exercised their fourth-year team option on McLemore's rookie scale contract, extending the contract through the 2016–17 season. On December 5, he had a season-best game with 19 points and 9 rebounds in a loss to the Houston Rockets. On January 28, 2016, he scored a season-high 26 points in a loss to the New Orleans Pelicans. On February 1, McLemore missed his first game of his career due to a sprained right wrist, snapping his consecutive games streak at 211, which was the second-longest in the NBA behind Tristan Thompson (335). He later missed 10 games in March with a finger-tip injury.

On February 10, 2017, McLemore had a season-high 22 points, helped by a career-best six three-pointers, in a 108–107 win over the Atlanta Hawks. On March 29, 2017, he tied a season high with 22 points in a 112–82 loss to the Utah Jazz.

Memphis Grizzlies (2017–2018)
On July 7, 2017, McLemore signed a multi-year contract with the Memphis Grizzlies. On August 8, 2017, he was ruled out for approximately 12 weeks after fracturing his right foot in a pickup game. On November 2, 2017, McLemore was assigned to the Memphis Hustle of the NBA G League. He was recalled a week later, and made his debut for the Grizzlies on November 11, 2017, recording four points and two rebounds in 18 minutes off the bench in a 111–96 loss to the Houston Rockets. On December 9, 2017, he scored a season-high 17 points in a 102–101 overtime loss to the Oklahoma City Thunder. On January 19, 2018, he set a new season high with 21 points in a 106–88 win over the Sacramento Kings.

Return to Sacramento (2018–2019)
On July 17, 2018, McLemore was traded, along with Deyonta Davis, a 2021 second-round pick and cash considerations, to the Sacramento Kings in exchange for Garrett Temple. On February 7, 2019, McLemore was waived by the Kings.

Houston Rockets (2019–2021)
On July 23, 2019, McLemore signed with the Houston Rockets.

On December 5, 2019, McLemore led the Rockets in scoring with a season-high 28 points, on top of career-best 8-of-17 shooting from behind the three-point arc in a 119–109 win against the Toronto Raptors. On December 7, 2019, McLemore finished with 27 points on 10-of-15 field goal shooting (5-of-9 from beyond the arc) in a 115–109 win against the Phoenix Suns, which is the first time he has contributed more than 25 points in consecutive games in his career.

On April 3, 2021, the Rockets waived McLemore.

Los Angeles Lakers (2021)
On April 6, 2021, McLemore signed with the Los Angeles Lakers. On April 8, he made his debut in a loss against the Miami Heat, scoring 6 points off the bench.

Portland Trail Blazers (2021–2022)
On August 5, 2021, McLemore signed with the Portland Trail Blazers. He made his debut for the team on October 23, scoring six points in a 134–105 win over the Phoenix Suns.

Shandong Hi-Speed Kirin (2023-present)
On January 31, 2023, McLemore signed a one-year contract with the Shandong Hi-Speed Kirin.

Player profile
Before he was drafted, McLemore's size, style of play, and abilities had garnered comparisons to former NBA All-Star Ray Allen.

Career statistics

NBA

Regular season

|-
| style="text-align:left;"|
| style="text-align:left;"|Sacramento
| 82 || 55 || 26.7 || .376 || .320 || .804 || 2.9 || 1.0 || .5 || .2 || 8.8
|-
| style="text-align:left;"|
| style="text-align:left;"|Sacramento
| 82 || 82 || 32.6 || .437 || .358 || .813 || 2.9 || 1.7 || .9 || .2 || 12.1
|-
| style="text-align:left;"|
| style="text-align:left;"|Sacramento
| 68 || 53 || 21.2 || .429 || .362 || .718 || 2.2 || 1.2 || .8 || .1 || 7.8
|-
| style="text-align:left;"|
| style="text-align:left;"|Sacramento
| 61 || 26 || 19.3 || .430 || .382 || .753 || 2.1 || .8 || .5 || .1 || 8.1
|-
| style="text-align:left;"|
| style="text-align:left;"|Memphis
| 56 || 17 || 19.5 || .421 || .346 || .828 || 2.5 || .9 || .7 || .3 || 7.5
|-
| style="text-align:left;"|
| style="text-align:left;"|Sacramento
| 19 || 0 || 8.3 || .391 || .415 || .667 || .9 || .2 || .3 || .1 || 3.9
|-
| style="text-align:left;"|
| style="text-align:left;"|Houston
| 71 || 23 || 22.8 || .444 || .400 || .746 || 2.2 || .8 || .6 || .2 || 10.1
|-
| style="text-align:left;" rowspan=2|
| style="text-align:left;"|Houston
| 32 || 4 || 16.8 || .357 || .331 || .719 || 2.1 || .9 || .6 || .1 || 7.4
|-
| style="text-align:left;"|L.A. Lakers
| 21 || 1 || 17.5 || .390 || .368 || .762 || 1.6 || .5 || .1 || .3 || 8.0
|-
| style="text-align:left;"|
| style="text-align:left;"|Portland
| 64 || 6 || 20.1 || .401 || .362 || .818 || 1.6 || .9 || .6 || .2 || 10.2
|- class="sortbottom"
| style="text-align:center;" colspan="2"|Career
| 556 || 267 || 22.5 || .414 || .363 || .780 || 2.3 || 1.0 || .6 || .2 || 9.0

Playoffs

|-
| style="text-align:left;"|2020
| style="text-align:left;"|Houston
| 11 || 0 || 11.8 || .375 || .389 ||  || 1.0 || .5 || .4 || .0 || 4.0
|-
| style="text-align:left;"|2021
| style="text-align:left;"|L.A. Lakers
| 4 || 0 || 9.0 || .222 || .333 || — || 1.8 || .3 || .3 || .0 || 1.5
|- class="sortbottom"
| style="text-align:center;" colspan="2"|Career
| 15 || 0 || 11.1 || .347 || .381 ||  || 1.2 || .5 || .3 || .0 || 3.3

College

|-
| style="text-align:left;"|2012–13
| style="text-align:left;"|Kansas
| 37 || 36 || 32.2 || .495 || .420 || .870 || 5.2 || 2.0 || 1.0 || .7 || 15.9

Personal life
On July 4, 2015, Wellston Avenue, the street on which McLemore grew up, was renamed Ben McLemore III Place in his honor.

In March 2017, McLemore's first child, Teagan, was born.

References

External links

 Kansas Jayhawks bio

1993 births
Living people
21st-century African-American sportspeople
African-American basketball players
All-American college men's basketball players
American men's basketball players
Basketball players from St. Louis
Houston Rockets players
Kansas Jayhawks men's basketball players
Los Angeles Lakers players
Memphis Grizzlies players
Memphis Hustle players
Portland Trail Blazers players
Sacramento Kings draft picks
Sacramento Kings players
Shandong Hi-Speed Kirin players
Shooting guards